Roman Reusch (born 3 February 1954) is a German politician for the Alternative for Germany (AfD) and since 2017 member of the Bundestag.

Life and politics
Reusch was born 1954 in the West German city of Düsseldorf and studied jurisprudence from 1978 to 1983 in Berlin. Reusch became a senior prosecutor (Oberstaatsanwalt) in 2003 in Berlin, but he was relocated to Brandenburg in 2008.
Reusch entered the newly founded populist AfD in 2013 and became a member of the Bundestag after the 2017 German federal election.
In June 2021, Reusch was no longer candidate in 2021 German federal election

References

1954 births
Politicians from Düsseldorf
Members of the Bundestag for Brandenburg
Living people
Members of the Bundestag 2017–2021
Members of the Bundestag for the Alternative for Germany